Kingsepp is an Estonian language occupational surname, literally meaning "shoemaker". Notable people with the surname include:

Sirje Kingsepp (born 1969), Estonian politician

Occupational surnames
Estonian-language surnames